Salehabad (also Romanized as Şāleḩābād; also known as Sālhābād) is a village in Mazraeh Now Rural District, in the Central District of Ashtian County, Markazi Province, Iran. At the 2006 census, its population was 359, in 104 families.

References 

Populated places in Ashtian County